H. elegans may refer to:
 Harpoceras elegans, an ammonite species in the genus Harpoceras
 Haplocyon elegans, an extinct mammal species
 Heuchera elegans, the urn-flowered alumroot, a flowering plant species endemic to California
 Hydrophis elegans, the elegant sea snake
 Hyospathe elegans, a palm species in the genus Hyospathe widespread in Central and South America, southward to Bolivia

Synonyms 
 Humboltia elegans, a synonym of Stelis roseopunctata, an orchid species